Michael David Kilian (16 July 1939 – 26 October 2005) was a journalist and author.  He was born in Toledo, Ohio and raised in Chicago and Westchester, New York.  Kilian died on 26 October 2005 from illness and was interred at Arlington National Cemetery.  In addition to being a long-time correspondent for the Chicago Tribune in Washington, D.C., Kilian was an accomplished author of numerous books, including the Harrison Raines Civil War mysteries. His father was instrumental in his education of the Civil War era and in visiting the many battlefield sites. His family includes early settlers of Virginia and New York, and Union soldiers who died at Fredericksburg and fought at Gettysburg on Little Round Top.  In 1993, Killian began writing the Dick Tracy comic strip with illustrator Dick Locher. One of their storylines involved Tess Trueheart serving Tracy with divorce papers. Kilian was survived by his wife of 35 years and two sons. Kilian also served in the Coast Guard Auxiliary.

Novels 
Harrison Raines series
Murder at Manassas - 2000 
A Killing at Ball's Bluff - 2001 
The Ironclad Alibi - 2002 
A Grave at Glorieta - 2003 
The Shiloh Sisters - 2003 
Antietam Assassins - 2005 
Bedford Green series
Weeping Woman - 2001 
Uninvited Countess - 2002 
Sinful Safari - 2003 
Other fiction
Valkyrie Project - 1981  
Northern Exposure - 1983  
Blood of the Czars - 1984 
By order of the President - 1986 
Dance on a Sinking Ship - 1988 
Looker - 1991 
Last Virginia gentleman - 1992 
Big score - 1993 
Major Washington - 1998 
Deepkill - 2005

Non-Fiction 
Who runs Chicago? - 1979 
Who runs Washington? - 1982 
Heavy losses: The dangerous decline of American defense (with James Coates) - 1985 
Flying can be Fun - 1985  (Pbk)

References 

1939 births
2005 deaths
American male journalists
20th-century American journalists
American mystery writers
American comics writers
Writers from Toledo, Ohio
Burials at Arlington National Cemetery
Chicago Tribune people
American male novelists
20th-century American novelists
Dick Tracy
Deaths from hepatitis
Novelists from Ohio
20th-century American male writers
United States Coast Guard auxiliarists